Partula tohiveana, common name the Moorean viviparous tree snail,  is a species of air-breathing tropical land snail, a terrestrial pulmonate gastropod mollusk in the family Partulidae. This species was endemic to highlands on Moorea, French Polynesia. It is now extinct in the wild.

References

External links

Partula (gastropod)
Taxonomy articles created by Polbot
Gastropods described in 1924